Château du Warthenberg is a ruined castle in the commune of Ernolsheim-lès-Saverne, in the department of Bas-Rhin, Alsace, France. It is a listed historical monument since 1994.

References

Ruined castles in Bas-Rhin
Monuments historiques of Bas-Rhin